Alexandru Gurănescu was a Romanian diplomat. He was minister plenipotentiary in Yugoslavia from 1931 to 1936 and in Austria from December 12, 1936, through to its annexation by Germany on April 10, 1938.

References

External links
 Portalul românilor din Austria 
 Potra, George G. - Reacţii necunoscute la demiterea lui Titulescu 29 August 1936: O "mazilire perfidă" - Magazin Istoric, 1998, Nr. 6

Ambassadors of Romania to Yugoslavia
Ambassadors of Romania to Austria